Singing on the Trail is a 1946 American Western film directed by Ray Nazarro and written by J. Benton Cheney. The film stars Ken Curtis, Jeff Donnell, Guy Kibbee, Dusty Anderson and Guinn "Big Boy" Williams. The film was released on September 2, 1946, by Columbia Pictures.

Plot

Cast          
Ken Curtis as Curt Stanton
Jeff Donnell as Cindy Brown
Guy Kibbee as Dusty Wyatt
Dusty Anderson as Helen Wyatt
Guinn "Big Boy" Williams as Big Boy Webster
Paul Trietsch as Hezzie 
Ken Trietsch as Ken 
Gil Taylor as Gil 
Charles Ward as Gabe
Ian Keith as Jerry Easton
Matt Willis as Dan Prichard
Sam Flint as Terrence Mallory
Joe Haworth as Pete 
Eddy Waller as Lem

References

External links
 

1946 films
1940s English-language films
American Western (genre) films
1946 Western (genre) films
Columbia Pictures films
Films directed by Ray Nazarro
American black-and-white films
1940s American films